Kora language may refer to:
the Korana language of South Africa
the Aka-Kora language of the Andaman Islands
The Koda language of eastern India, sometimes called Kora